Cneppyn Gwerthrynion (c. 13th century) was a Welsh poet and grammarian.

None of Cneppyn's work has survived although his name is recorded by Gwilym Ddu o Arfon as among a number of poets of renown in his own elegy to Trahaearn. Cneppyn's name is also recorded in a manuscript 'Pum Llyfr Kerddwriaeth' ('The five books of poetic art') as a grammarian.

References
G. J. Williams and E. J. Jones, eds., 'Gramadegau'r penceirddiaid', Caerdydd, 1934

13th-century deaths
13th-century Welsh poets
Year of birth unknown